Yoon So-yi (born Moon So-yi on January 5, 1985) is a South Korean actress. She debuted as a print and commercial model, then began acting in Ryoo Seung-wan's action-comedy film Arahan in 2004, followed by Shadowless Sword in 2005. Yoon has had leading roles in television dramas, notably in Goodbye Solo (2006), Glass Castle (2008), Hero (2009), and Warrior Baek Dong-soo (2011).

Career
Yoon So-yi made her entertainment debut as a model in Graffiti Magazine in 2001. After a few years of print and commercial modeling, she auditioned for Ryoo Seung-wan's action comedy Arahan in 2004. Based on a popular South Korean comic, Arahan explored the consequences of unleashing an ancient evil spirit into a modern city, with Yoon's character part of a hidden school of ancient masters who train a naive young policeman to fight this evil force. Yoon underwent strict training for six months in a film action school, where she had to overcome her phobia of heights. The film was a relative commercial success, with one review describing her as "tall and attractive in an excellently non-cutesy way." She received a Best New Actress nomination at the 2004 Blue Dragon Film Awards.

Yoon next starred in the TV drama Say You Love Me, a dark, twisted love story between four people. This led to a friendship with her co-star Kim Rae-won, with whom she starred in a series of advertisements for Samsung Digital Plaza. When Kim later launched his own management company Bless Entertainment, she would also join his stable of stars.

After playing Jung Joon-ho's love interest in The Twins, Yoon was cast in Shadowless Sword, a wuxia martial arts epic set in ancient Korea. In the role of a beautiful young swordswoman who protects the future king, Yoon said that she was inspired by Anita Mui in The Heroic Trio, and that the strong-willed female character appealed to her. She learned wushu for three months in Korea, then wire action from the Chinese stunt team.

In 2006, she became part of the ensemble cast of Goodbye Solo, written by renowned drama writer Noh Hee-kyung. Even though her dramas do not attract a large number of viewers, Noh has gained a cult following for her in-depth portrayal of ordinary characters, taking a more human natural approach through realistic and yet emotional lines. Goodbye Solo featured seven characters of different generations and backgrounds, as they reflect on human nature and relationships. Yoon would later work again with mostly the same crew in the 2-episode TV special Several Questions That Make Us Happy.

Goodbye Solo'''s writer Noh and veteran actress Bae Jong-ok introduced Yoon to Join Together Society (JTS), a Seoul-based Buddhist international relief agency (Yoon herself is a Buddhist). Since then she has been extremely active in charity work for JTS, spearheading street fund drives and various programs to benefit underprivileged children in North Korea and developing countries.

An athlete in junior high, Yoon was a Sports Model major at Dongduk Women's University, but eventually dropped out due to showbiz commitments. She later enrolled in Dongguk University as a Theatre and Film major, slowing down her acting activities to focus on her studies and becoming known in the Korean press as one of the very few celebrity model students, with regular attendance and good grades. Yoon graduated in 2011.

Her next project Auction House attempted a different format from the standard serialized Korean drama. The twelve-episode first season in 2007 had four directors and four writers, airing one episode every week, with each director producing his own segment in his own style, crossing genres. The episodic format was not a hit with Korean audiences (despite a second season focusing on plastic surgeons with a completely different cast).

Yoon then played a former reporter struggling to adjust to life as a chaebol daughter-in-law in Glass Castle; the drama was a modest success in 2008. She was cast as a last-minute replacement leading lady in 2009 in the quirky Lee Joon-gi-starrer Hero.Wee, Geun-woo (November 17, 2009). "Lee Jun-ki says Hero is the perfect fit". 10Asia. Despite being praised as a well-acted and solid drama, Hero received low ratings. Yoon returned to the big screen in Try to Remember, about lovers in the past whose love transcends time and brings them together in the present day, premiered at the 2010 Puchon International Fantastic Film Festival.

She was cast as Queen Seondeok in a specially commissioned 20-minute film for the 2011 Gyeongju World Culture Expo. Titled Byeongnucheon ("The Bracelet of Blue Tears"), the fantasy adventure aimed to spearhead Korea's nascent stereoscopic film industry, combining live action sequences with 3D animated computer graphics.

Later that year, Yoon's period drama Warrior Baek Dong-soo brought in high viewership ratings, topping its timeslot for 3 straight months. She immediately followed that with the Channel A cable series Color of Woman, replacing Eugene as the romantic comedy lead when the latter dropped out in the aftermath of her sister's car accident.

For her first variety MC job, Yoon co-hosted the 2012 televised magicians tournament King of Magic, which aired on cable for three weeks.

A supporting role followed in 2013 spy action series Iris II: New Generation, in which she played a South Korean college student who defects to North Korea, trains in the special forces and counter-terrorism units, then returns to her home country as a North Korean spy. She headlined the 2014 daily drama Angel's Revenge in the role of a nun who avenges her sister, then joined the cast of police procedural Hidden Identity'' in 2015.

In May 2016, Yoon signed with new management agency JS Pictures.

Personal life

Yoon married musical actor Jo Sung-yoon in May 2017. On September 13, 2021, Yoon posted a photo on Instagram saying, she is pregnant and expected to give birth soon  Yoon later gave birth to her daughter in November 2021.

Filmography

Film

Television

Music video

Commercials

Awards and nominations

References

External links

South Korean television actresses
South Korean film actresses
1985 births
People from Seoul
Living people
Dongguk University alumni
South Korean Buddhists